Sadie Lea Weidner (March 3, 1875 – December 24, 1939) was an American missionary to Japan.  She involved in church reforms.
She was the founder of Mino mission in Japan.

Biography 
Born on March 3, 1875, at Upper Milford, Pennsylvania, Sadie Lea Weidner was the daughter of Edwin H. Weidner and Rebecca (Schultz) Weidner. She started her education at Baltimore Elementary School in Ohio. She also studied at Mount Eaton and Bellevue high schools. She later continued her higher education at Heidelberg University in Tiffin, Ohio. She briefly learned at the Moody Bible Institute, Chicago. She began her professional career as a teacher and taught in an elementary school for a period of five years.

When she came to Japan for the first time in June 1900, she was assigned as a school teacher and missionary in Sendai City, Miyagi Prefecture. During a brief visit to USA in 1907, she went to different local churches in order to mobilize support for Miyagi Girls' School and the mission activity in Japan. Meanwhile, in 1909, she learned courses on language, and school system and its legal aspects at Columbia University.

In August 1909, on her return to Japan, she was assigned as the principal of Miyagi Girls' School. She later became the official founder of the school. In 1918 she established a group of Christian churches, known as Mino mission, in Gifu Prefecture.

She died on December 24, 1939.

References

1875 births
1939 deaths